Charlotte Amalie of Hesse-Philippsthal (11 August 1730, Philippsthal – 7 September 1801, Meiningen), was Duchess and regent from 1763 to 1782 of Saxe-Meiningen.

Life 
Charlotte Amalie was a daughter of Landgrave Charles I of Hesse-Philippsthal and his wife, Princess Christine of Saxe-Eisenach.  In 1750, when she was 20 years old, she married with the 63-year-old Duke Anton Ulrich of Saxe-Meiningen to whom she gave eight children.

The Duke stipulated in his last will and testament that Charlotte Amalie would act as the sole guardian of their sons and regent of Saxe-Meiningen.  Anton Ulrich had retired to Frankfurt, away from the family squabbles, and lived there with his family.  After her husband's death she first traveled to Philippsthal to await an imperial decision confirming her as guardian and regent.  Relatives from Gotha travelled to Meiningen, in anticipation of the inheritance. After the imperial decision confirmed her as regent and first guardian, she could move to Meiningen.

When she took over the regency in 1763, the country was financially and economically ruined.  With strict austerity measures and reforms, economic reconstruction and promotion of spiritual life, she is considered the "savior of the Duchy".  The appointment of new ministers, like Adolph Gottlieb von Eyben, allowed the central government to effectively function again within one year.  With a sophisticated system of savings and financial analysis at the court she attracted the attention of Emperor Joseph II, who appointed her as Director of the Commission to save the even more hopelessly indebted Duchy of Saxe-Hildburghausen.

Since her sons were entitled to rule jointly, she ruled jointly with her eldest son Charles from 1775 to 1782, when George I was still a minor.

Her reign was the breakthrough of enlightened absolutism in Saxe-Meiningen, and she raised her sons to continue that policy.  She founded the Masonic lodge  ("Charlotte and the three carnations").  In accordance with her last wishes, she was not buried in the royal crypt, but in the town cemetery.

Issue 
Charlotte Amalie from her marriage had the following children:
 Charlotte (1751–1827)
 married Duke Ernest II of Saxe-Gotha-Altenburg (1745-1804)
 Louise (1752–1805)
 married in 1781 Landgrave Adolph of Hesse-Philippsthal-Barchfeld (1743-1803)
 Elizabeth (1753–1754)
 Charles (1754–1782), Duke of Saxe-Meiningen
 married in 1780 Princess Louise of Stolberg-Gedern (1764-1834)
 Frederick Francis (1756–1761)
 Frederick William (1757–1758)
 George I (1761–1803), Duke of Saxe-Meiningen
 married in 1782 Princess Louise Eleanore of Hohenlohe-Langenburg (1763-1837)
 Amalie (1762–1798)
 married in 1783 Prince Charles Henry Erdmann of Carolath-Beuthen (1759-1817)

References 
 L. Hertel: Meiningische Geschichte von 1680 bis zur Gegenwart = Schriften des Vereins für Sachsen-Meiningische Geschichte und Landeskunde, issue 47, Hildburghausen, 1904.

Duchesses of Saxe-Meiningen
18th-century women rulers
House of Hesse
1730 births
1801 deaths
Regents of Germany
18th-century German people
Daughters of monarchs